Kadavanthra metro station is the 18th metro station of Kochi Metro from Aluva. It is a downtown station located at GCDA  lawns  catering passengers for Kadavanthra and  Panampilly Nagar, situated in between  Ernakulam South  and Elamkulam metro stations. The station is based on the theme of " History of print media in Kerala". It was opened on 4 September 2019 as a part of the extension of the metro system from Maharaja's to Thaikoodam.

References

Kochi Metro stations
Railway stations in India opened in 2019